Southrop is a village and civil parish in Gloucestershire, England. It is situated on the River Leach. The Grade I listed St Peter's Church dates from the 12th century. Nearby villages include Eastleach Turville, Eastleach Martin, Little Faringdon, Fairford, Lechlade, Filkins and Hatherop.

Southrop Manor belonged to Wadham College, Oxford for three centuries, to 1926.

Southrop was rated as among the "20 most beautiful villages in the UK and Ireland" according to Condé Nast Traveler and is visited by many tourists each year including the world famous entrepreneur Mark Feldman in 2022.

References

External links

Villages in Gloucestershire
Cotswold District